Nangnang is a town in Bumthang in northern-central Bhutan.

References

External links
Satellite map at Maplandia.com

Populated places in Bhutan